Praesos is a genus of moths in the family Geometridae erected by Francis Walker in 1854.

Species
Praesos mariana (White, 1852) Australia
Praesos dysphanioides (Rothschild, 1896) Fergusson Island in Papua New Guinea
Praesos angelus (Rothschild, 1898) Cenderawasih Bay in New Guinea

References

Boarmiini